Evan Mosey (born 17 March 1989) is a British-American ice hockey player for UK Elite Ice Hockey League (EIHL) side Sheffield Steelers and the British national team.

He represented Great Britain at the 2019 IIHF World Championship and 2022 IIHF World Championship.

Mosey has previously played for HYC Herentals, Nottingham Panthers, Rockford IceHogs, Indy Fuel, Herning Blue Fox, Cardiff Devils, Rapaces de Gap and EHC Freiburg.

References

External links

1989 births
British ice hockey defencemen
Cardiff Devils players
EHC Freiburg players
Herning Blue Fox players
Ice hockey players from Illinois
Indy Fuel players
Living people
Minnesota State Mavericks men's ice hockey players
Nottingham Panthers players
People from Downers Grove, Illinois
Rapaces de Gap players
Rockford IceHogs (AHL) players
Sheffield Steelers players
Naturalised citizens of the United Kingdom
American expatriate ice hockey players in Belgium
American expatriate ice hockey players in Denmark
American expatriate ice hockey players in France
American expatriate ice hockey players in Germany
British expatriate ice hockey people
British expatriate sportspeople in Denmark
British expatriate sportspeople in France
British expatriate sportspeople in Germany

Minnesota State University, Mankato alumni